Pierre Surirey de Saint-Remy (1645–1716) was a French general.

He followed a military career and from 1670 in the Royal Corps of Artillery. Provincial Commissioner of Artillery in 1692, he is the author of Mémoires d'artillerie, published for the first time in 1697.

He was named a lieutenant of the Grand maître de l'artillerie de France in 1703 and was a maréchal de camp.

He married Marie-Madeleine Hénault, the aunt of Charles-Jean-François Hénault, in 1672.

Publications 
 Mémoires d'artillerie... (1697)

Sources 
 Michaud, Biographie universelle, ancienne et moderne, 1825
 François-Xavier de Feller, Dictionnaire historique, ou histoire abrégée des hommes qui se sont fait un nom par le génie, les talents, les vertus, les erreurs, 1824

1645 births
1716 deaths
French generals
French military writers
People of the Ancien Régime